The  is located in Kurayoshi, Tottori Prefecture, Japan, and dedicated to the history of the pear. Nashi are cultivated in the prefecture and are one of its mascots.

See also
 Nashi pear
 List of food and beverage museums

References

External links

  Tottori Nijisseiki Pear Museum

Agriculture museums in Japan
Food museums in Japan
Kurayoshi, Tottori
Museums in Tottori Prefecture
Pears
Museums established in 2001
2001 establishments in Japan